Spratelloides robustus, the blue sprat, also known as the fringe-scale round herring, blue bait or blue sardine, is a type of sprat fish.

Description and behavior
The Spratelloides robustus has no spine, but has 10–14 Dorsal soft rays, 9–14 Anal soft rays, and 46–47 vertebrae, and a W-shaped pelvic scute. They are oviparous.

Distribution and habititat
The Spratelloides robustus mainly lives around southern Australia, at a range from the Dampier Archipelago to the south of Queensland, including Tasmania.

Footnotes

Clupeidae
Fish described in 1897